This is list of libraries in South Africa.

National Libraries in South Africa 

 National Library of South Africa
 South African Library for the Blind
 SAAO Library

Legal Deposit Libraries in South Africa 

 Adelaide Tambo Public Library
 Constitutional Court Library
 Msunduzi Municipal Library
 National Library of South Africa [ Cape Town ]
 National Library of South Africa [ Pretoria ]
 Parliamentary Information Centre
 RJR Masiea Public Library

Academic Libraries in South Africa 

 Rhodes University Library
 University of Cape Town Libraries
 University of Pretoria Library Services
 University of Venda Library
 University of the Western Cape Library Services
 University of Johannesburg Library 
 North-West University Library Service
 Sefako Makgotho Health Sciences Library
 University of Fort Hare Libraries
 University of South Africa (UNISA) Library
 Walter Sisulu University Library 
 University of Zululand Library 
 Vaal University of Technology Library
 University of the Free State Library
 University of Mpumalanga Library
 University of KwaZulu-Natal Library 
 Mangosuthu University of Technology Library
 Tshwane University of Technology Library
 Durban University of Technology Library
 Central University of Technology Library, Free State
 Cape Peninsula University of Technology Libraries 
 Sol Plaatje University Library 
 Nelson Mandela University Library

Library Consortia 

 South East Academic Libraries System
 South African National Library and Information Consortium (SANLIC)
 Committee of Higher Education Libraries of South Africa (CHELSA)

Public Libraries

Public Libraries in the Western Cape 
 Central Library Cape Town
 Fish Hoek Library
 Meadowridge Library
 Rondebosch Library
 Strandfontein Library
 Archibishop Desmond Tutu Library (Swellendam)
 Adriaanse Public Library
 Athlone Public Library
 Avondale Public Library
 Belhar Public Library
 Bellville Public Library
 Bellville South Public Library
 Bishop Lavis Public Library
 Bloubergstrand Public Library
 Bonteheuwel Public Library
 Bothasig Public Library
 Brackenfell Public Library
 Bridgetown Public Library
 Brooklyn Public Library
 Browns Farm Public Library
 Camps Bay Public Library
 Central Public Library
 Claremont Public Library
 Colin Eglin Sea Point Public Library
 Crossroads Public Library
 Delft Public Library
 Delft South Public Library
 Dunoon Public Library
 Durbanville Public Library
 Edgemead Public Library
 Eerste River Public Library
 Eikendal Public Library
 Elsies River Public Library
 Fisantekraal Public Library
 Fish Hoek Public Library
 Goodwood Public Library
 Gordon's Bay Public Library
 Grassy Park Public Library
 Gugulethu Public Library
 Hangberg Public Library
 Hanover Park Public Library
 Harare Public Library
 Heideveld Public Library
 Hout Bay Public Library
 Huguenot Square Public Library
 Kensington Public Library
 King Williams Town Library
 Khayelitsha Public Library
 Kloof Street Public Library
 Koeberg Public Library
 Kommetjie Public Library
 Kraaifontein Public Library
 Kuils River Public Library

Public Libraries in Gauteng 

 Johannesburg City Library
 Orlando East Public Library
 Sandton Public Library

Public Libraries in Eastern Cape 

  Burgersdorp Public Library
  Martin Luther Public Library
  Venterstad Public Library
  Mzamomhle Public Library

Public Libraries in Kwa-Zulu Natal 

 Kokstad Public Library
 Kranskop Public Library
 Harding Public Library 
 Estcourt Public Library
 Margate Library

Public Libraries in Free State 

 Adelaide Tambo Library 
 Bloemfontein City Library

Public Libraries in Limpopo 

 Bela-Bela Public Library 
 Blouberg Municipality Library 
 Burgersfort Public Library 
 Drakensig Public Library 
 Ga-Phaahla Community Library 
 Gravelotte Public Library 
 Giyani Public Library
 Hoedspruit Public Library 
 Kgapane Public Library 
 Seleteng Library
 Rapotokwane Community Library

Public Libraries in Northern Cape 

 Kakamas Public Library
 De Aar Public Library
 Garies Public Library
 Alexanderbaai Library
 Judy Scott Library 
 Barkly West Library
 Bendell Library
 Black Rock Library
 Hotazel Library
 Kimberley Library

Public Libraries in Mpumalanga 

 Amsterdam Library 
 Chrissiemeer Library
 Klipfontein Library 
 Kriel Library 
 Lydenburg Library
 Nelspruit Library
 Ogies Library
 Sabie Library 
 Secunda Library

Public Libraries in North-West 

 Brits Public Library 
 Hartbeespoortdam Public Library
 Oukasie Library
 Mothotlung Library
 Letlhabile Library
 Jericho Library
 Lethabong Library
 Hebron Library
 Kosmos Library
 Damonsville Library
 Rustenburg Public Library
 Legkraal Library
 Mphebatho Library
 Phokeng Library
 Tlokweng Library
 Mogwase Library
 Mabeskraal Library
 Marikana Library
 Reagile Library
 Swartruggens Library
 Coligny Public Library
 Koster Public Library
 Papi Ntjana Library
 Amalia Library
 Glaudina Library
 Ipelegeng Library
 Schwezer-Reneke
 Kamogelo Dual Purpose Library
 H C Bosman Library
 Lehurutshe Library
 Supingstad Library
 Zeerust Library
 Potchefstroom Library
 Ipeleng Library
 Ikageng Library
 Promosa Library
 Mohadin Library
 Kanonnierspark Library
 Matlwang Dual Purpose Library
 Tshing Library
 Ventersdorp Library
 Touvlug Dual Purpose Library
 Motaung Dual Purpose Library
 Mogopa Dual Purpose Library
 Lucas Modise Dual Purpose Library

Special Collection Libraries 

 Africana Library, Kimberley 
 Amazwi South African Museum of Literature
 Brenthurst Library
 Cory Library for Humanities Research
 Documentation Centre for Music
 Jacob Gitlin Library
 Killie Campbell Africana Library
 Margaret Smith Library
 Niven Library, Percy FitzPatrick Institute of African Ornithology, University of Cape Town
 Old Merensky Library
 University of Pretoria Special Collections
 University of Cape Town Special Collections
 Workers' Library and Museum
 Natural History Library (Iziko Museums)
 Social History Library (Iziko Museums)
 South African National Gallery Library (Iziko Museums)
 South African Broadcasting Corporation (SABC) Information Library

See also 

 History of libraries in South Africa
 Library and Information Association of South Africa
 List of archives
 List of museums in South Africa
 Molteno Regulations
 South African Library Week

References 

 
Archives
South Africa
Libraries